Mazdaran (also Romanized as Mazdārān, Mazdārūn, Mazd Dārān, Misdaran, and Mozdārān) is a village in Hablerud Rural District, in the Central District of Firuzkuh County, Tehran Province, Iran. At the 2006 census, its population was 445, in 156 families.

References 

Populated places in Firuzkuh County